Even the Rain is a 2010 drama film directed by Icíar Bollaín and written by Paul Laverty.

The plot concerns Mexican director Sebastián (played by Gael García Bernal), Spanish executive producer Costa (played by Luis Tosar), and their group of actors who travel to Bolivia in order shoot a film depicting the Spanish conquest of the New World. The members of the Spanish film crew unexpectedly find themselves in a moral crisis when they arrive at Cochabamba, Bolivia, during the intensifying Cochabamba Water War in which their key indigenous actor Daniel (Juan Carlos Aduviri) gets increasingly involved.

Shot in Bolivia, it is an internationally co-produced film by companies from Spain, Mexico and France.

The film received nominations and awards internationally, including an Ariel Award for Best Ibero-American Film and three Goya Awards. The film was also nominated as Spain's entry for the 2011 Academy Award for Best Foreign Language Film.

Plot 
Mexican filmmaker Sebastián (Gael García Bernal) and his Spanish executive producer Costa (Luis Tosar) arrive in Cochabamba, Bolivia, accompanied by the cast and crew, prepared to create a historical film depicting Christopher Columbus's first voyage to the New World, the imposition of Spanish authority over the natives, and the subsequent indigenous rebellion by Hatuey. Cognizant of his limited budget, Costa decides to film in Bolivia, the poorest country in South America. Hundreds of Bolivian locals show up and wait in long lines in response to the open casting pamphlet. Costa is enthusiastic to save thousands of dollars by having underpaid extras perform tasks on set meant to be completed by experienced engineers.

Sebastián casts a local man named Daniel (Juan Carlos Aduviri) in the role of Hatuey, the Taíno chief who led a rebellion against Columbus. Daniel's daughter Belén lands a crucial role in the film as well. Their first encounter with Daniel is during the casting process. When casting directors start to turn people away in line, Daniel starts to make a scene and states that everyone should get a chance to audition, as the pamphlet advertised. The first encounter with Daniel makes Costa oppose his casting, but Sebastian sees Daniel's fire and liveliness even in the line protesting for a chance for his daughter as perfect for the role. He is just the character they're looking for. Sebastián is unaware that Daniel is leading demonstrations against new government-protected water company during water privatization plan. Filming begins smoothly despite the alcoholism of the actor Anton (Karra Elejalde), cast as Columbus, but when Costa observes Daniel's revolutionary involvement, he becomes increasingly uneasy about his reliability as Daniel has a critical role in the film.

A conflict that occurred between Costa and Daniel early in the film was when Daniel heard Costa express how they were getting away with paying the native extras so poorly. Costa decides to speak badly of the natives right in front of Daniel in English not knowing that Daniel understands English as well. Because of this Daniel becomes more aware of how Costa and the rest of the crew are taking advantage of the natives. After seeing that Daniel understands that abuse, Costa becomes more cognizant of it himself and starts to feel guilty, which ultimately leads to the rapid development of his character throughout the remainder of the film.

As the crew begins to wrap up the film, the exasperation of the natives intensifies. They begin to consider fighting for their rights to water by creating a riot and protesting in the streets. All these efforts are led by none other than Daniel, who despite being asked to lay low and even paid for his cooperation to film the movie smoothly, continues to protest. Costa reaches his breaking point with Daniel when after going to a protest he gets beaten by the police. He decides to try to bribe Daniel to stop going, offering him several thousand dollars to stay silent for a few weeks. Daniel agrees, accepting the money, but spends it on funding the protesters and remains involved, eventually becoming bloodied and imprisoned. Sebastián experiences moral conflict and begins to doubt the likelihood of the film's completion, but is reassured by Costa, who bribes the police for Daniel's temporary release to film a key scene, in which Colón and his conquistadors execute Hatuey and his rebels. Upon this scene's completion, the police arrive in the Bolivian jungle and detain Daniel again, but are besieged by the film's extras which allows Daniel to escape.

That night, when actors Juan and Alberto see the latest news reports showing violence in Cochabamba, they become so worried that they demand to leave. Sebastián begs them to stay and they agree begrudgingly. The next day, as the cast and crew prepare to depart for filming, Costa is met by Daniel's wife, Teresa, who desperately implores him to assist her in finding her daughter Belén, who has disappeared into the protests and is reportedly wounded and needing hospitalization. Despite Costa trying to turn her down he is eventually won over by Teresa's persistence, and despite Sebastián's equally impassioned insistence against it, he leaves with her.

Riding through the streets of Cochabamba, Costa sees the damage done to the streets and the city itself, finally realizing the seriousness of the situation that he and his crew have just stumbled upon.

After Costa and Teresa's obstacle-laden drive through riotous Cochabamba, Belén's life is saved, but her leg is badly injured and may never fully heal. Meanwhile, the rest of the crew is stopped by a military blockade and all except Antón leave Sebastián to journey home. The revolution ends shortly thereafter with the departure of the multinational water company, but Cochabamba is left in ruins from the conflict. Costa expresses hope that the film will be finished after all, and Daniel emotionally presents him with a vial of Bolivian water in appreciation for saving his daughter.

Cast 
 Luis Tosar as Costa, executive producer in the movie
 Gael García Bernal as Sebastián, director in the movie
 Juan Carlos Aduviri as Daniel, Bolivian native cast as Hatuey
 Karra Elejalde as Antón, alcoholic Spanish actor cast as Colón
 Raúl Arévalo as Juan, Spanish actor cast as Montesinos
 Carlos Santos as Alberto, Spanish actor cast as Las Casas
 Cassandra Ciangherotti as María, assistant director to Sebastián
 Milena Soliz as Belén, Daniel's daughter cast as Panuca in the movie
 Leónidas Chiri as Teresa, Bolivian native and Daniel's wife
 Ezequiel Días as Bruno

Release 
On 16 September 2010, the film premiered at the Toronto International Film Festival. In October, it released in the United States (Los Angeles, California), Britain (London Film Festival), and Spain (Valladolid Film Festival). It made its French debut at the Les Arcs International Film Festival in December 2010.  It was screened in the Panorama section at the 61st Berlin International Film Festival, followed by the 2011 Sydney Film Festival. After special screenings in Cochabamba's Southern Zone and for the Bolivian press, it opened in Bolivia on twelve screens on March 17, 2011.

Reception

Awards 

Academy Award Entry

The film was selected in September 2010 over Daniel Monzón's Cell 211 which also stars Luis Tosar, as the Spanish entry for the Best Foreign Language Film category at the 83rd Academy Awards. In January 2011, it landed a spot on the list of the top nine films in its category. However, it was not selected to be among the final five films nominated for the Oscar.

Ariel Awards
 Best Ibero-American Film

Berlin International Film Festival
 Panorama Audience Award, Fiction Film

Cinema Writers Circle Awards

Won
 Best Cinematography (Alex Catalán)
 Best Director (Icíar Bollaín)
 Best Film (Icíar Bollaín)
 Best Score (Alberto Iglesias)
 Best Original Screenplay (Paul Laverty)
 Best Supporting Actor (Karra Elejalde)

Nominated
 Best Actor (Luis Tosar)
 Best Editing (Ángel Hernández Zoido)

European Film Awards Nomination
 Audience Award, Best Film

Goya Awards

Won
 Best Original Score (Alberto Iglesias)
 Best Production Supervision (Cristina Zumárraga)
 Best Supporting Actor (Karra Elejalde)

Nominated
 Best Actor (Luis Tosar)
 Best Costume Design (Sonia Grande)
 Best Director (Icíar Bollaín)
 Best Editing (Ángel Hernández Zoido)
 Best Film (Juan Gordon)
 Best Make-Up and Hairstyles (Karmele Soler & Paco Rodríguez)
 Best New Actor (Juan Carlos Aduviri)
 Best Original Screenplay (Paul Laverty)
 Best Sound (Nacho Royo, Emilio Cortés, & Pelayo Gutiérrez)
 Best Special Effects (Gustavo Harry Farias & Juan Manuel Nogales)

Palm Springs International Film Festival
 Bridging the Borders Award

Latin ACE Awards
 Cinema – Best Director (Icíar Bollaín)
 Cinema – Best Film (Icíar Bollaín)
 Cinema – Best Supporting Actor (Gael García Bernal)

Spanish Music Awards
 Best Score (Alberto Iglesias)

Critical response
The film received generally positive reviews, earning an 88% approval rating on Rotten Tomatoes, but some critics pointed out potential hypocrisy as a shortcoming. Roger Ebert admires the filmmakers' courage in choosing the Bolivian water crisis as subject matter, but notes potential hypocrisy, writing, "…at the end I looked in vain for a credit saying, 'No extras were underpaid in the making of this film.'" The New York Times writer Stephen Holden also raises this concern, asserting, "You can't help but wonder to what degree its makers exploited the extras recruited to play 16th-century Indians." Also, Holden addresses Costa's transformation, writing, "Mr. Tosar goes as far as he can to make the character's change of heart believable, but he can't accomplish the impossible." Contrarily, Marshall Fine of the Huffington Post views Tosar's efforts as praiseworthy, calling him "perfect as the producer: bull-headed, charming, conniving and wheedling when he needs to be – but a man with a vision, who ultimately gets his mind changed. Tosar makes his conflict not only credible but palpable."  Praising the film overall, Ann Hornaday of The Washington Post calls Even the Rain "a story in which personal connections can transcend even the most crushing structures of history and politics."

Historical context 

The restoration of civilian rule to Bolivia in 1982 ended decades of military dictatorships, but did not bring economic stability. In 1985, with hyperinflation at an annual rate of 25 thousand percent, few foreign investors would do business in the country. The Bolivian government turned to the World Bank as a last refuge against economic meltdown. For the next 20 years, successive governments followed the World Bank's provisions in order to qualify for continued loans from the organization. In order to move towards independent development, Bolivia privatised its railways, telephone system, national airlines, and hydrocarbon industry. In October 1999, the privatization of Cochabamba's municipal water supply followed, allowed by a new law and the investment of a new firm, Aguas del Tunari – a joint venture involving San Francisco-based Bechtel Corporation. The agreement involved the firm investing in a long-envisioned dam so they dramatically raised water rates.

Protests, largely organized through the Coordinadora in Defense of Water and Life, a community coalition, erupted in January, February, and April 2000, culminating in tens of thousands marching downtown and battling police in the 2000 Cochabamba protests. In April 2000, the national government reached an agreement with the Coordinadora to reverse the privatization. The wave of demonstrations and police violence was described as a public uprising against water prices.

Production
Even the Rain is one of Icíar Bollaín's most ambitious films. Shot in Bolivia, in the Chapare jungle, and in the city of Cochabamba, the film is a large production with more than 4,000 extras in total, with about 300 of the extras being indigenous people, as well as a team of 130 people and more than 70 locations, almost all of them outdoors.

Fact and fiction

Even the Rain is a movie within a movie.It follows the production of a period film about the myth of Christopher Columbus, whom few paint as he really was: a man obsessed with gold, a slave hunter, and a repressor of ethnic groups. The story's context is based on real events in the year 2000, when the population of one of the poorest nations in South America rose up against a powerful American company, Bechtel, and recovered a basic good: water. The strikes and protests of citizens were left ignored for days after the American company tried to raise the price of water. The scale of the protest was such that Bechtel eventually abandoned the Bolivian market, the water contract was canceled, and a new company was installed under public control. In 2005, half of the 60,000 people in Cochabamba were still without water and the rest only received intermittent service (some for as little as three hours a day). The film portrays the lasting impacts of colonialism on native people on multiple levels, as well as the continuation of colonialism in today's society. In many ways, the film can refer back to the deep historical roots about resistance against colonialism. Even in an entirely different time period, the Bolivian people still resist Western influence and political corruption to gain rights.

See also
 Cinema of Spain
 List of submissions to the 83rd Academy Awards for Best Foreign Language Film
 List of Spanish submissions for the Academy Award for Best Foreign Language Film
 Bolivian presidential election, 2005
 Water supply and sanitation in Bolivia
 The Corporation (2003), documentary that features the Cochabamba protests, directed by Mark Achbar and Jennifer Abbott
 Blue Gold: World Water Wars (2008) directed by Sam Bozzo
 Quantum of Solace (2008), a James Bond movie whose main theme is the water supply issue in Bolivia

Further reading
 "Bolivia: The state of siege is no excuse for human rights violations" by Amnesty International, April 2000.
 Violence Erupts in Bolivia by BBC in April 2000
 "Return to Cochabamba," a 2008 report by Jean Friedman-Rudovsky on post-revolutionary Bolivia
 ¡Cochabamba! Water War in Bolivia by Oscar Olivera in collaboration with Tom Lewis
 Timeline: Cochabamba Water Revolt,
 Water Privatization Case Study: Cochabamba, Bolivia by Public Citizen
  "Cochabamba – Water War," a June 2000 report commissioned and published by the U.K.-based Public Services International Research Unit
 "The Politics of Water" in Bolivia by Jim Shultz in January 2005 for The Nation.
  "Letter from Bolivia: Leasing the Rain," by William Finnegan in 2002 for The New Yorker

References

External links
 
 
 
 Even the Rain indieWIRE
 Blurring Past and Present Interview with director Iciar Bollain on The Mantle.

2010 films
2010 drama films
2010s Spanish-language films
Films about filmmaking
Films set in 2000
Films scored by Alberto Iglesias
Films set in Bolivia
Films shot in Bolivia
French drama films
Indigenous cinema in Latin America
Mexican drama films
Quechua-language films
Spanish drama films
Films directed by Icíar Bollaín
Morena Films films
2010s Spanish films
2010s French films
2010s Mexican films